Karine Bakhoum is a restaurant public relations consultant.

Career
Karine Bakhoum is an active NAACP member specialized in lifestyle, hospitality public relations, consulting and media networking.

Television
She has appeared on the Food Network series Iron Chef America.

References

External links

American women chefs
Year of birth missing (living people)
Living people
21st-century American women
Reality cooking competition contestants